Matías Rodríguez may refer to:

 Matías Rodríguez (footballer, born 1986)
 Matías Rodríguez (footballer, born 1987)
 Matías Rodríguez (footballer, born 1993)
 Matías Rodríguez, governor of the Mexican state of Hidalgo from 1925-1929.

Close matches may include:

 Matías Rodríguez Inciarte, Spanish politician, born 1948.
 Mathías Rodríguez, Uruguayan footballer, born 1997.